Jabar Koruna, is a village in Malakand District of Khyber-Pakhtunkhwa. It is located at 32°58'30N 70°57'54E with an altitude of 398 metres (1309 feet).

References

Populated places in Malakand District